Jordan Cox may refer to:

 Jordan Cox (cricketer) (born 2000), English cricketer
 Jordan Cox (rugby league) (1992–2020), English rugby league player
 Jordan Cox (tennis) (born 1992), American tennis player
 Jordan Cox (née Sullivan), a character on television series Scrubs